Trym may refer to:

 Þrymr (Thrym), a jötunn in Nordic mythology
 Trym Torson, a Norwegian drummer
 River Trym in Bristol